The George and Martha Hitchcock House, also known as the Fuller-McGuire House, is a private house located at 205 East Michigan Street in Farwell, Michigan.  It was designated a Michigan State Historic Site in 1996 and listed on the National Register of Historic Places in 1985.

History
George Hitchcock was born in Watertown, Connecticut in 1825.  In 1851, he married Martha Hall, daughter of a prominent Detroit family.  Hitchcock worked on the railroad for a number of years, and in 1857 moved to Owosso, Michigan and opened a drugstore.  He later moved to Isabella County, and in 1870 went into business with his brother-in-law Edmund Hall.  In 1871, the Hitchcocks moved to and founded the village of Farwell as part of Hitchcock and Hall's logging operations in Clare County.  They established the Farwell City Company, which owned the town, and Farwell became manager of the company.  Hitchcock also acted as the city's first postmaster and Clare County's first treasurer, and established mills in the area.

After living in the area for some time, George Hitchcock and his wife Martha hired the Detroit firm of Mason & Rice to design this house; construction was completed in 1885. George Hitchcock died in 1889.  The house is still privately owned.

Description
The George and Martha Hitchcock House is a two-story asymmetrical wood-framed Queen Anne structure clad with clapboards.  The front facade spans four bays, with the rightmost bay recessed, transitioning into a bay window corner.  The porch was altered in the 1950s by extending it across the front facade.  The attic has a pedimented gable over the three left bays with an elaborate molded lintel.

References

Houses on the National Register of Historic Places in Michigan
Queen Anne architecture in Michigan
Hotel buildings completed in 1885
Houses in Clare County, Michigan
Michigan State Historic Sites
National Register of Historic Places in Clare County, Michigan
1885 establishments in Michigan